Stefan Quandt (born 9 May 1966) is a German billionaire heir, engineer and industrialist. As of October 2021, his net worth is estimated at US$23.2 billion and ranked at number 89 on Bloomberg Billionaires Index.

Early life
Quandt was born in Bad Homburg to Herbert Quandt and Johanna Quandt. He earned a degree from the University of Karlsruhe where he studied economics and engineering, from 1987 to 1993.

Career
From 1993–1994, Quandt worked for the Boston Consulting Group in Munich. From 1994 to 1996 he worked for Datacard Group of Minneapolis as a marketing manager in Hong Kong.

BMW
On his father's death in 1982 Quandt inherited 17.4% of BMW, the company his father had saved from bankruptcy in 1959. From further purchases he later owned 23.7% of the company. Following his mother’s death in 2015, Quandt’s voting stake in BMW temporarily increased to 34.19 percent, above a 30 percent threshold which triggered a compulsory takeover offer under German rules. He subsequently asked the Federal Financial Supervisory Authority (BaFin) to be excused from these rules. 

In 2018, Quandt became BMW’s largest single shareholder when his direct ownership increased with shares inherited from his mother, giving him a so-called “blocking stake” of 25.83 percent, worth 13.4 billion euros ($16.6 billion). He currently serves BMW as a deputy chairman of the supervisory board.

Delton
Quandt also inherited from his father substantial holdings in other companies, many of which he has been running through his holding company, Delton AG, since 1989. These include:
 76.8% of CEAG, (small power supplies and recharging devices for mobile phones)
 87.6% of Logwin AG (formerly Thiel Logistik, a logistics and freight forwarding company)
 100% of Biologische Heilmittel Heel GmbH, which makes homeopathic preparations
 100% of CeDo Household Products, which makes freezer bags, plastic and aluminium wraps and foils, bin liners, and coffee filters

With his mother, Quandt owned 18.3% of Gemplus International, a large digital security company, before its merger to form Gemalto in 2006.

Aqton
With a second holding company, Aqton SE, Quandt manages other investments, including in renewable energies:
 Heliatek, organic solar panels
 Solarwatt, manufacturer of PV panels, solar batteries and energy management solutions
 Kiwigrid, grid based renewable energy solution for utilities
 BHF, financial services

Philanthropy
Through the non-profit Aqtivator, Quandt supports projects for children, youth, and families with a focus on education, integration, and equal opportunity.

Other activities

Corporate boards
 Frankfurter Allgemeine Zeitung, Member of the Supervisory Board (since 2019)
 Dresdner Bank, former Member of the Supervisory Board
 Gerling Konzern Allgemeine Versicherungs, former Member of the Supervisory Board

Non-profit organizations
 Friends of the Museum für Moderne Kunst, Chair of the Board (since 2015)
 Karlsruhe Institute of Technology (KIT), Member of the Supervisory Board (since 2013)
 BMW Foundation, Member of the Board of Trustees
 Eberhard von Kuenheim Foundation, Member of the Board of Trustees
 Johanna Quandt Foundation, Member of the Board of Trustees
 Stiftung Charité, Member of the Board of Trustees

Political activities
Following the 2013 elections, Quandt – together with his mother and his sister – made donations to the Christian Democratic Union (CDU) totaling 690,000 euros.<ref>Alexandra Hudson (15 October 2013), BMW family donation to Merkel's party stokes lobbying row Reuters’'.</ref> Ahead of the 2017 elections, he gave 50,000 euros each to both the CDU and liberal Free Democratic Party (FDP).

Personal life
In autumn 2005, Quandt married Katharina, a software engineer. They have a daughter, born on New Year's Eve that same year. He has been seen watching football matches, but otherwise keeps a low profile. They live in Frankfurt, Germany.

The Silence of the Quandts
The Hanns-Joachim-Friedrichs-Award winning documentary film The Silence of the Quandts'' by the German public broadcaster ARD described in October 2007 the role of the Quandt family businesses during the Second World War. The family's Nazi past was not well known, but the documentary film revealed this to a wide audience and confronted the Quandts about the use of slave labourers in the family's factories during World War II. As a result, five days after the showing, four family members announced, on behalf of the entire Quandt family, their intention to fund a research project in which a historian will examine the family's activities during Adolf Hitler's dictatorship. The independent 1,200-page study researched and compiled by Bonn historian, Joachim Scholtyseck, that was released in 2011 concluded: "The Quandts were linked inseparably with the crimes of the Nazis".  no compensation, apology or memorial at the site of one of their factories, have been permitted. BMW was not implicated in the report.

References

External links 
 Photo

1966 births
Living people
Directors of BMW
Boston Consulting Group people
German billionaires
Businesspeople from Hesse
Engineers from Hesse
German people of Dutch descent
German expatriates in Hong Kong
Karlsruhe Institute of Technology alumni
People from Bad Homburg vor der Höhe
Stefan
20th-century German businesspeople
21st-century German businesspeople
German industrialists